Fabrice Emmerick Darbelet (born August 4, 1973 in Moulins, France) is a French former professional footballer. He played as a midfielder.

External links
Emmerick Darbelet profile at chamoisfc79.fr

1973 births
Living people
French footballers
Association football midfielders
Stade Rennais F.C. players
Le Mans FC players
Amiens SC players
AC Ajaccio players
Chamois Niortais F.C. players
Clermont Foot players
FC Rouen players
Ligue 2 players
AS Moulins players
Sportspeople from Moulins, Allier
Footballers from Auvergne-Rhône-Alpes